Patrick Bowes-Lyon, 15th and 2nd Earl of Strathmore and Kinghorne,  (22 September 1884 – 25 May 1949) was a British nobleman and peer. As the eldest brother of Queen Elizabeth The Queen Mother, he was an uncle of Queen Elizabeth II of the United Kingdom.

Life
Patrick Bowes-Lyon was born on 22 September 1884 at St Paul's Walden Bury, Hertfordshire to Claude Bowes-Lyon, 14th Earl of Strathmore and Kinghorne and Cecilia Cavendish-Bentinck. He was an older brother of Elizabeth Bowes-Lyon (later The Queen Mother), and therefore an uncle of Elizabeth II and Princess Margaret. At the outbreak of World War I, he went into service with the Black Watch. On 19 June 1920, he was appointed a deputy lieutenant of Forfarshire.

As a maternal uncle of the bride, Bowes-Lyon was a leading guest at the 1947 wedding of Princess Elizabeth and Philip Mountbatten.

Marriage and issue
The Earl married Lady Dorothy Beatrix Godolphin Osborne (3 December 1888 – 18 June 1946), daughter of George Osborne, 10th Duke of Leeds, on 21 November 1908 in London. The couple had four children:
 Hon. John Patrick Bowes-Lyon, Master of Glamis (1 January 1910 – 19 September 1941), killed in action, unmarried
 Lady Cecilia Bowes-Lyon (28 February 1912 – 20 March 1947) she was a bridesmaid at the wedding of Prince Albert, Duke of York, and Lady Elizabeth Bowes-Lyon on 26 April 1923. She married Major Kenneth Douglas Evelyn Herbert Harington (30 September 1911 – 13 January 2007) on 8 March 1939.
 Timothy Patrick Bowes-Lyon, 16th Earl of Strathmore and Kinghorne (18 March 1918 – 13 September 1972) married Mary Bridget Brennan (1923 – 8 September 1967) on 18 June 1958. They had one daughter who died in infancy.
 Lady Nancy Moira Bowes-Lyon (18 March 1918 – 11 February 1959) she married Lance Amigo Percy Burra Robinson (25 February 1917 – 21 June 2010) on 25 April 1940; they were divorced in 1950. They have two sons. She remarried John Michael Matheson Blair (25 May 1925 – 16 December 1955) in 1954.

Death
The Countess of Strathmore and Kinghorne died on 18 June 1946, aged 57. Patrick Bowes-Lyon outlived her by almost three years and died on 25 May 1949 in Angus, Scotland, aged 64.

Ancestry

Notes

References

15
Strathmore and Kinghorne, Patrick Bowes-Lyon, 15th Earl of
Strathmore and Kinghorne, Patrick Bowes-Lyon, 15th Earl of
Patrick
People from North Hertfordshire District
Deputy Lieutenants of Angus
Deputy Lieutenants of Forfarshire
Earls in the Peerage of the United Kingdom
Military personnel from Hertfordshire
British Army personnel of World War I
Black Watch officers